TrawsCymru is the brand name for a network of regional bus services in Wales, sponsored by the Welsh Government. It was introduced as a replacement for the TrawsCambria network.

History

Launch plans
In 2010, the Welsh Assembly ran a consultation on improvements to the existing TrawsCambria network. In 2011, a programme of improvements for TrawsCambria services X40 (Carmarthen - Pencader - Lampeter - Aberaeron - Aberystwyth) and 704/T4 (Newtown - Brecon/Merthyr) was announced.

Under these plans services T4 & X40 and T4, and the network as a whole, were to be re-launched under the new TrawsCymru brand. Service X40 was to be re-numbered TC1 and T4 would have become TC4, along with extension south to Cardiff. During 2012, these two routes were to receive new Optare Tempos equipped with coach style seating, greater luggage space, real time information and WiFi.

The plans for re-numbering T4 were dropped, but the new vehicles and extension to Cardiff were introduced. The six additional WAG-funded Optare Tempos with leather seats, free WiFi and tables operate alongside the existing three Optare Tempos that had previously worked the T4 service.

The X40 was originally scheduled to be replaced by TrawsCymru service T1/TC1 from 1 April 2012  under a contract until 31 March 2020 on offer. However it later emerged that Arriva Buses Wales intended to stop operating the X40 service, along with its share of route 550, from 26 February. Instead Arriva introduced services branded Cymru Express on a fully commercial basis in place of the former TrawsCambria X40.

Change of plan
Because of the commercial CymruExpress, the TC1 TrawsCymru service could not be introduced. The six new buses that had been ordered to operate the TC1 were thus placed into store. These were longer than the new vehicles for the TC4, so were later taken out of storage and put to use on the T4 service, to increase capacity. They replaced three of the vehicles that had been ordered for the TC4, which joined the remaining three unused vehicles which had been intended for the TC1 in store. In August 2013, the Welsh Government launched an express bus service between Cardiff Central station and Cardiff Airport. This was branded as a TrawsCymru route, given the number T9. Five of the six TrawsCymru buses were taken out of storage to operate this service, later being joined by the sixth.

Arriva's CymruExpress services ceased on 21 December 2013, meaning a TrawsCymru service between Aberystwyth and Carmarthen was once again a possibility. Interim contracts to continue bus services on the route were let pending the introduction of a TrawsCymru service.

Review
In July 2013, it emerged that Welsh Transport Minister, Edwina Hart, had commissioned a review of the TrawsCymru network. This was to be undertaken by Director of the Bevan Foundation, Dr Victoria Winckler.

This outcome of this review was published by in February 2014, defining the purpose of TrawsCymru as a network of medium-to-long-distance (defined as 25 miles or more), strategically important bus services that connect key towns in Wales – complementing the rail network.

The report's recommendations included:
 TrawsCymru requires a strategic, all-Wales, approach. Currently, TrawsCymru contracts are let by four different local authorities and this approach was considered too fragmented.
 That the implementation of any new corridors should be based on robust business plans which demonstrate demand and provide for a package of measures to improve the passenger journey.
 TrawsCymru should complement the rail network and not seek to compete with rail services. Where justified by demand, it should provide good connections to onward rail services, but it should not be driven by or secondary to the rail network.
 Service quality provision:
 TrawsCymru services should serve intermediate bus stops as well as main towns, but should avoid detours.
 The impact of intermediate stops/detours should increase the journey duration by no more than 50% longer than by car, and ideally less (around 33% being preferable).
 TrawsCymru should promote and accept CymruConnect (rail and bus combined) through-tickets, and action should be taken to improve the profile and performance of CymruConnect.
 TrawsCymru services need to address passenger facilities at bus stations and passenger information, which are part of responding to passenger needs.
 Focus of effort in the short term should be on completing the rebrand of the five core TrawsCymru routes (T1 to T5) from TrawsCambria, rather than expansion of the TrawsCymru network to new routes
 The TrawsCymru strategic board should focus on strategic issues with corridor delivery groups dealing with operational matters, on a formal basis. Both groups should have strengthened user representation.

2014 & 2015 launches
During 2014, the roll-out of the TrawsCymru brand to the other TrawsCambria corridors finally began. The first route to appear was the Carmarthen-Aberystwyth route, but the original plan for the service to become known as TC1 has been dropped. The TrawsCymru service was instead launched under the service number T1, in August 2014. Unlike the T4 and T9 TrawsCymru contracts, the operator provides vehicles for the T1, rather than using vehicles owned by the Welsh Government. It remains to be seen how the vehicles used will compare to the Welsh Government owned ones on the other routes.

Invitations To Tender were also published for the remaining three TrawsCambria routes X50 (Aberystwyth-Cardigan), T2 (Bangor-Aberystwyth) and X94 (Wrexham-Barmouth), to be known as T5, T2 and T3 respectively. The X94 became the T3 in November 2014, and the X50 the T5 in January 2015. The T2 contract was expected to start in 2014, but due to last minute registrations of commercial workings by the incumbent operators ended up being let as a short term extension without TrawsCymru branding. In November 2015, the T2 was finally launched with branded buses in due course. Lloyds Coaches have ordered three Optare MetroCitys with the first two due in January 2016 and the third due in March 2016.

Routes

T1, T1C & T1S

The T1 service commenced operating on 4 August 2014. An hourly service is provided Monday to Saturday with a few Sunday journeys. A late evening working also operates, between Aberystwyth and Lampeter. A single service number is used, but buses take two different routes between Pencader and Lampeter in order to serve intermediate villages every two hours (prior to the T1 launch, one village had an hourly bus service and the other nothing).

The T1 is operated by First Cymru using standard buses from their existing fleet in TrawsCymru livery; many duties are subcontracted to Mid Wales Travel drivers. From August 2014 to July 2016 they used two Alexander Dennis Enviro200s and three Alexander Dennis Enviro300s, and from July 2016 to present they use five Enviro300s. Since December 2016 a Wright Eclipse Urban bodied Volvo B7RLE has also been T1 liveried and allocated.

Journey time for the T1 is 2 hours 15 minutes. According to Dr Winckler's review, the journey time by car is 1 hour 25 minutes, meaning the bus service takes 58% longer than driving and hence misses the target set by the review.

From 5 December 2016 to 14 April 2018, First Cymru operated the T1C service using the T1 fleet, which was then a once per day (except Sundays) extension of the T1 to Swansea and Cardiff, introduced as a replacement for the more frequent 701 service which had ceased operating in August 2016 when its final operator, Lewis Coaches, ceased trading. The full journey time of the combined T1 & T1C service when operated by First Cymru was 4 hours 35 minutes.

From 16 April 2018, NAT Group took over operation of the T1C service. Though still once per day, the use of a separate Aberystwyth to Cardiff service by coach (in this case a Mercedes-Benz Tourismo bodied Mercedes-Benz OC 500 RF and Sunday operation both resumed, neither of which had been seen since the 701. The T1C as operated by NAT Group takes advantage of being a separate service to the T1 by bypassing Lampeter, Llanybydder, and from Monday to Saturday, Swansea, taking an hour off the full journey time which is now 3 hours 35 minutes.

The T1S service also commenced operation by First Cymru on 16 April 2018 using the T1 fleet. The T1S provides connections at Carmarthen for passengers travelling between Aberystwyth and Swansea on Monday to Saturday, has an approximate full journey time of 1 hour and additionally serves the National Botanic Garden of Wales once per day in either direction.

T2

The T2 service is operated by Lloyds Coaches (formerly Lloyds Coaches and Express Motors until the latter's closure in January 2018) and runs twice a day from Bangor to Aberystwyth, with additional workings over part of the route on Mondays to Saturdays. This service was introduced towards the end of September 2012, when Arriva Buses Wales cancelled TrawsCambria service X32. The T2 would have been the second TrawsCymru service launched but its status as a TrawsCymru service was dubious for many years as although the operators referred to the service as TrawsCymru from the start they did not have any TrawsCymru branded vehicles for use on the service. Instead, they used buses in their own standard liveries.  In March 2016, the service was upgraded with four TrawsCymru branded Optare MetroCitys.

In January 2018, one of those MetroCities, which was the one owned by Express Motors, was replaced by a brand new one owned by Lloyds Coaches. Since then, the original one was acquired and joined the fleet.

T3

The T3 service commenced operating on 2 November 2014. A more frequent Monday to Saturday service is provided compared to the previous TrawsCambria service X94 it replaces along with improved connections with the T2 service in Dolgellau. GHA Coaches were awarded a seven-year contract to operate the service, initially with existing buses (one single deck Scania OmniCity of which was TrawsCymru liveried) before taking delivery of three Alexander Dennis Enviro400 bodied Scania N230UDs and an Alexander Dennis Enviro200, all fitted with Wi-Fi and leather seats in 2015. Journey time is 2 hours 30 minutes. Following the collapse of GHA Coaches in July 2016, the service was immediately taken over by Lloyds Coaches.

Initially, Lloyds Coaches entirely used vehicles they already owned, before acquiring all three of the Scania-ADL Enviro400s, but not the OmniCity nor the ADL Enviro200, the latter of which went to NAT Group as one of the T6 vehicles, so a different Enviro200 was used in its place. As of July 2017 that Enviro200 has been replaced with two brand new Optare MetroCitys.

T4 & T14

The T4 was the first TrawsCymru service to be launched on 31 May 2011 and is operated by Stagecoach South Wales, who also operated the previous TrawsCambria 704 (which operated between Newtown and Brecon only).

The service as launched was operated with nine Optare Tempos, branded TrawsCymru, three of which had been ordered and used on the 704 and were repainted into TrawsCymru livery. The other six were new vehicles introduced to extend the service to Cardiff. The new vehicles were to an enhanced standard with a new design of seat and WiFi.

The three aging former TrawsCambria Optare Tempos were finally retired in May to June 2017 after more than a decade of service, and replaced with three transferred two-year-old Alexander Dennis Enviro300 bodied Scania K230UBs.

The T14 service (Cardiff to Hereford via Merthyr Tydfil, Brecon and Hay-on-Wye) commenced operating on 2 September 2018.

In July 2019, 12 MCV Evoras were introduced for use on both the T4 and the T14 replacing the remaining Tempos and Enviro300s.

The service is the longest end-to-end journey on the TrawsCymru network, with a journey time of 3 hours 50 minutes.

T5

The T5 was commenced on 5 January 2015. Roughly hourly departures are provided from Aberystwyth, Cardigan, Fishguard and Haverfordwest but the service is made up of a number of different routes, the most frequent being:
 Aberystwyth - New Quay - Cardigan - Fishguard - Mathry Road - Haverfordwest and
 Aberystwyth - New Quay - Aberporth - Cardigan - Fishguard - Mathry Road - Haverfordwest (between Cardigan and Aberystwyth, this was formerly known as TrawsCambria service 550)
Additionally:
 One trip in each direction does not travel via New Quay (the northbound service is a short working, starting from Cardigan)
 Several short-workings between Haverfordwest and Cardigan/Newport do not travel via Mathry Road
 Some journeys operate via Goodwick and/or Trecwn

Shortly before the service launched, the TrawsCymru website was updated to include the service, with the report: "The TrawsCymru T5 provides a regular and direct service along the scenic Cambrian Coast, linking Aberystwyth, Aberaeron, New Quay, Cardigan, Fishguard and Haverfordwest." This is inaccurate because not all journeys serve New Quay and the inclusion of Fishguard and (on some trips) New Quay and Aberporth means the service is by no means direct. The website also reported that the service operates 7 days per week, when in fact there are no services between 03:00 on Sundays and 05:45 on Mondays (effectively no Sunday service). By 8 January 2015, this latter error had been corrected to say that the service operates 6 days per week.

The service was initially operated with existing buses, including four former TrawsCambria Optare Tempos, and four VDL SB200s (two with Wright Pulsar 2 bodies, one with an old-style Wright Pulsar body and one with an MCV Evolution body registered as YJ14CCV, which is a one-off, as it is an ex-demonstrator that only received orders on other chassis). All of these vehicles received TrawsCymru livery and seating, and in 2015 were joined by four new Optare MetroCitys. While the Tempos remain on the service, the fact that they are ageing former TrawsCambria examples (same as the older T4 ones withdrawn in 2017) as opposed to the newer ones used on the T4 and T9, means that the MetroCitys and SB200s are somewhat prioritised. The new MCV Evora bodied Volvo B8RLEs received for the T11 have been known to operate the T5.

T6

The T6 was Previously Known as Service X63 & X64 and was renumbered and added to the TrawsCymru Network in 2015 The Service Starts in Swansea and Runs Via Swansea University Bay Campus, Neath, Aberdulais Falls, Ystradgynlais and Abercrave, Dan Yr Ogof Show Caves and then terminating in Brecon.

The T6 Runs 7 Days a Week Hourly Monday To Saturday with Five journeys in each direction on Sundays and bank holidays.  

Since 2015 The Service has been run by New Adventure Travel out of The Swansea Depot. using Optare MetroCity and Alexander Dennis Enviro 200 and were painted in TrawsCymru livery for the Service. 

In early 2021 The Service was upgraded to newer Optare MetroCity Painted in the New 2021 TrawsCymru livery for the T6 Service. These Buses were originally intended for use for T9 Service, but the service was suspended in 2020 due to Covid-19.

T7

In April 2020, Stagecoach West announced it would cease to operate the Severn Express and X14 routes on 13 June. On 10 June 2020, NAT Group announced that it would continue the Severn Express route working in partnership with Monmouthshire County Council and TrawsCymru. The route was operated on a 6 month trial basis until 31 December 2020. 
Newport Bus will take over the route on 4 January 2021 and route will be renumbered from X7 to T7. Newport Bus will operate the route using two MCV Evoras previously operated by Stagecoach South Wales on their T4/T14 TrawsCymru routes.

T9

The T9 service commenced operating on 1 August 2013. It was initially operated by First Cymru and ran every 20 minutes, 7 days a week. Five Optare Tempos are allocated to the service. The buses used were reported to be those ordered for the Carmarthen - Aberystwyth TC1 service. On 1 November 2014 New Adventure Travel took over operation of the route, which was reduced to a half-hourly. It was restored to a 20 minutes frequency in April 2015.

At around 15 miles, the route falls some way short of the 25 mile minimum distance given in Dr Victoria Winckler's review of TrawsCymru (see sub-section of history section above). The journey time from Cardiff Airport to Cardiff Central is 40 minutes. Due to the circular route via Cardiff Bay, the journey from Cardiff Central to the airport is only 30 minutes.

TrawsCymru Connect
A number of shorter services are designated as TrawsCymru Cyswllt.

These were initially not mentioned on the TrawsCymru website and the vehicles used did carry any special livery or branding, until late 2017 when Richards Bros' Optare Versa and their brand new Enviro200 received the Cyswllt
livery.

As of February 2018, First Cymru have had the Cyswllt livery applied to one of their Enviro200s.

From 2019 the services now appear on TrawsCymru literature. The present routes include:

T11 (Fishguard-Haverfordwest)
T12 (Machynlleth-Newtown-Wrexham)
460 (Cardigan-Carmarthen)
X43 (Brecon-Abergavenny)

References

External links
 
 TrawsCymru website

Bus transport brands
Bus transport in Cardiff
Bus transport in Wales
2011 establishments in Wales